Bagher Kalhor (born 23 May 1979) is an Iranian alpine skier. He competed in the men's slalom at the 2002 Winter Olympics.

References

1979 births
Living people
Iranian male alpine skiers
Olympic alpine skiers of Iran
Alpine skiers at the 2002 Winter Olympics
Alpine skiers at the 1999 Asian Winter Games
Alpine skiers at the 2003 Asian Winter Games
Alpine skiers at the 2007 Asian Winter Games